Eurotower is a 40-storey,  skyscraper in the Innenstadt district of Frankfurt, Germany. The building served as the seat of the European Central Bank (ECB) until 18 March 2015, at which point it was officially replaced by a new purpose-built building. It now hosts the European Central Bank's Single Supervisory Mechanism.

The building is located at Willy-Brandt-Platz in Frankfurt's central business district, the Bankenviertel, opposite to the Opern- und Schauspielhaus Frankfurt. Right next to the building is an underground U-Bahn station and an above-ground tram station.

History 

The tower was designed by architect Richard Heil and was built between 1971 and 1977. The first main tenant was the Bank für Gemeinwirtschaft. The building was later used by the European Monetary Institute, the forerunner of the European Central Bank that was established in 1998.

Until 2013, a club/restaurant called Living XXL was situated in the basement.

Because of the limited space in the Eurotower the personnel of the ECB were also (up to March 2015) distributed between two other skyscrapers in the Bankenviertel, the Eurotheum and Neue Mainzer Straße 32–36. This was considered less than optimal, so in the late 1990s the ECB began a process to have a new seat built on a site in the eastend of Frankfurt. This was originally envisaged to bring together all the bank's personnel in one place, however with the increase in the ECB's responsibilities with the EU Single Supervisory Mechanism, the ECB will retain its presence in the Eurotower after its refurbishment. Construction of the new tower started in 2008 and was completed in late 2014. In November of that year bank personnel started to transfer from the Eurotower to their new offices at the Seat.

Skyscrapers in Frankfurt

See also 
 European Central Bank
 Seat of the European Central Bank
 Institutional seats of the European Union
 List of tallest buildings in the European Union
 List of tallest buildings in Germany
 List of tallest buildings in Frankfurt

References

External links 
 

Bankenviertel
Buildings and structures of the European Union
Eurotower
Government buildings completed in 1977
Skyscrapers in Frankfurt
Skyscraper office buildings in Germany
Office buildings completed in 1977